Chicken and Biscuits may refer to:
Chicken & Biscuits, studio album by American country music singer/rapper Colt Ford
Chicken & Biscuits (play), a 2021 Broadway play starring Norm Lewis and Michael Urie
Bojangles' Famous Chicken 'n Biscuits, Southeastern United States regional chain of fast food restaurants, specializing in cajun seasoning, fried chicken, and buttermilk biscuits
Popeyes Chicken and Biscuits or Popeyes, American multinational chain of fried chicken fast food restaurants
Mrs. Winner's Chicken & Biscuits, Southeastern United States regional chain of fast food restaurants which specializes in fried chicken

See also
Chicken in a Biskit, chicken-flavored snack cracker